June Madness is a 1922 American silent comedy film directed by Harry Beaumont and starring Viola Dana, Bryant Washburn, and Gerald Pring.

Cast
 Viola Dana as Clytie Whitmore 
 Bryant Washburn as Ken Pauling 
 Gerald Pring as Cadbury Todd II 
 Léon Bary as Hamilton Peeke 
 Eugenie Besserer as Mrs. Whitmore 
 Snitz Edwards as Pennetti 
 Anita Fraser as Mamie O'Gallagher

References

Bibliography
 Munden, Kenneth White. The American Film Institute Catalog of Motion Pictures Produced in the United States, Part 1. University of California Press, 1997.

External links

1922 films
Silent American comedy films
Films directed by Harry Beaumont
American silent feature films
1920s English-language films
American black-and-white films
Metro Pictures films
1922 comedy films
1920s American films